Co-operative University or similar, may refer to:

 Co-operative University, Sagaing, Sagaing, Sagaing, Myanmar
 Co-operative University, Thanlyin, Thanlyin, Yangon, Myanmar
 Cooperative University of Colombia, Colombia
 Moshi Co-operative University, Moshi, Tanzania
 The Co-operative University of Kenya, Nairobi, Kenya; see List of universities and colleges in Kenya
 Independent Cooperative University, France; see List of universities and colleges in France

See also

 Cooperativeness
 Cooperative
 Co-operative College, a British school charity
 cooperative learning
 co-operative education
 co-operative studies
 Cooperative School (disambiguation)

Wikipedia disambiguation